Micajah Autry (1793March 6, 1836) was an American merchant, poet and lawyer who died in the Texas Revolution at the Battle of the Alamo.

From Natchitoches, Louisiana, on December 13 he wrote: "About 20 men from Tennessee formed our squad....  [T]he war [in Texas] is still going on favorably to the Texans, but it is thought that Santa Anna will make a descent with his whole force in the Spring, but there will be soldiers enough of the real grit in Texas by that time to overrun all of Mexico....  We have between 400 and 500 miles to foot it to the seat of government, for we cannot get horses, but we have sworn allegiance to each other and will get along somehow."

After a siege lasting 13 days, Autry was killed with the rest of the Alamo garrison after the Mexican army stormed it on March 6, 1836. Among some of his possessions now housed at the Alamo in San Antonio, Texas, is an eagle approximately 3 feet high which he carved. They also have a collection of his letters and poetry written to his beloved wife.

See also
Davy Crockett
Antonio López de Santa Anna
Alamo Mission in San Antonio
Battle of the Alamo

References

Sources
"Micajah Autry, A Soldier of the Alamo," Adele B. Looscan, Southwestern Historical Quarterly, April 1911.
James Lockhart Autry Papers, Woodson Research Center, Fondren Library, Rice University, Houston, Texas.
100 Days in Texas: The Alamo Letters, Wallace O. Chariton, Plano, Texas: Wordware Publishing, Inc., 1989.

External links
Micajah Autry in the Handbook of Texas Online
Autry heritage website
Micajah Autry's Alamo memorial at Find a Grave
Micajah Autry's monument at Hillcrest Cemetery in northern Mississippi, also on Find a Grave

1793 births
1836 deaths
Alamo defenders
Military personnel killed in action
People of the Texas Revolution
American lawyers admitted to the practice of law by reading law
Burials at Hillcrest Cemetery